St. Anne's Church in Augsburg, Germany, is a medieval church building that was originally part of a monastery built in 1321.  It is notable for its elaborate interior decoration.

History
St. Anne's was built in 1321 by Carmelite friars.  
In 1518 Martin Luther stayed there with the Carmelite friars when he was in Augsburg to meet the papal legate, Cardinal Cajetan, who wanted Luther to submit to the pope. The church converted to Lutheranism in 1545.

On October 31, 1999, representatives of the Catholic and Evangelical Lutheran churches signed the Joint Declaration on the Doctrine of Justification in the Church of St. Anna.  This is considered one of the most important events for the ecumenical movement. After a long period of closure, the Lutherstiege museum was reopened in 2012. A comprehensive renovation was completed in 2016/17.

List of preachers from 1545
 1545: M. Johann Heinrich Held
 1551: Johann Mattsperger(Interim)
 1551: Kaspar Huberinus
 1552: M. Johann Meckhardt
 1559: M. Georg Eckhard
 1568: M. Martin Rieger
 1579: Dr. Georg Müller(Mylius)
 1584: Matthäus Herbst
 1586: Stephan Engelbronner
 1586: Johannes Baier
 1589: Johann Rosslin
 1592: M. Georg Riederer
 1593: M. Kaspar Sauter

The building
The church ceiling is decorated with Baroque and Rococo stuccowork, with frescoes by Johann Georg Bergmüller. The Goldsmiths' Chapel (Goldschmiedekapelle) was donated in 1420 by Conrad and Afra Hirn.

The Fugger chapel, which is the burial chapel of the Fuggers, is the earliest example of Renaissance architecture in Germany. It was endowed in 1509 by Ulrich and Jakob Fugger (the latter of which was buried in the chapel). Among the features are a marble pavement, an organ with painted shutters, stained glass, choir stalls, a sculptural group of the Lamentation of Christ, and memorial relief tablets in the style of Dürer.

The spire was added in 1607 by Elias Holl.

References

 St. Anna (Augsburg) on German Wikipedia
 St. Anne's church
 Geschichte der St. Anna-Kirche in Augsburg By Julius Hans
 Stammbaum der Familie Lotter in Schwaben By Carl Lotter

Augsburg Anne
Churches in Augsburg
Augsburg Anne
Augsburg Anne
Buildings and structures in Augsburg
Buildings and structures associated with the Fugger family